David Tennant (born 13 June 1945) is an English former footballer who made 75 appearances in the Football League playing as a goalkeeper for Walsall, Lincoln City and Rochdale. He also played non-league football for Worcester City, Corby Town and Skegness Town.

References

1945 births
Living people
Sportspeople from Walsall
English footballers
Association football goalkeepers
Walsall F.C. players
Worcester City F.C. players
Lincoln City F.C. players
Rochdale A.F.C. players
Corby Town F.C. players
Skegness Town A.F.C. players
English Football League players